Kent Halvor Carlsson (born 23 August 1951 in Gothenburg, Sweden) is a retired Swedish Olympic sailor in the Finn and Star classes. He competed in the 1976 Summer Olympics, 1980 Summer Olympics and in the 1984 Summer Olympics, best finishing 4th in the 1984 edition together with Henrik Eyermann in Star.

References

Olympic sailors of Sweden
Swedish male sailors (sport)
Star class sailors
Finn class sailors
Sailors at the 1976 Summer Olympics – Finn
Sailors at the 1980 Summer Olympics – Finn
Sailors at the 1984 Summer Olympics – Star
1951 births
Living people
Sportspeople from Gothenburg
World champions in sailing for Sweden
OK class world champions
OK class sailors